Abu ol Hayat (also Romanized as Abū ol Ḩayāt; also known as Bal Hayāt, Bolḩayāt, Bu ol Hayāt, and Tang-e Abū ol Ḩayāt) is a village in Kuhmareh Rural District, Kuhmareh District, Kazerun County, Fars Province, Iran. At the 2006 census, its population was 805, in 176 families.

References 

Populated places in Kazerun County